An anxiogenic or panicogenic substance is one that causes anxiety. This effect is in contrast to anxiolytic agents, which inhibits anxiety.  Together these categories of psychoactive compounds may be referred to as anxiotropic compounds.

Anxiogenic effects can be measured by, for example, the hole-board test in rats and mice. A number of agents are used to provoke anxiety (anxiogens) or panic (panicogens) in experimental models. Some of the most common substances are: carbon dioxide (as carbogen), sodium lactate, cocaine, substituted amphetamines, caffeine, L-DOPA, methylphenidate, modafinil, GABA antagonists such as DMCM, FG-7142 and ZK-93426, serotonergic agents such as mCPP and LY-293,284, adrenergic agents such as yohimbine, psychoactive agents such as THC and LSD in susceptible individuals, antipsychotics/dopamine antagonists such as ecopipam and reserpine, and cholecystokinin (CCK) (especially the tetrapeptide and octapeptide fragments CCK-4 and CCK-8). Sodium lactate given intravenously has been proven to cause panic attacks in people with a panic disorder but not in people with no such history.
 
The GABAA receptor negative allosteric modulator flumazenil can cause panic attacks in people with panic disorder.

Anxiolytic substances have the opposite effect in that they reduce anxiety. The most common class of anxiolytic drugs are the benzodiazepines. However, studies suggest that benzodiazepines may be anxiogenic in the long term. Selective serotonin reuptake inhibitors are commonly prescribed antidepressants that treat anxiety in the long term. However, SSRIs are ineffective in the short-term treatment of acute panic attacks or acute anxiety.

See also
Depressogenic
Anxiolytic
Selective serotonin reuptake inhibitor

References

External links

 
Drug classes defined by psychological effects